Ryan Kelly may refer to:

Ryan Kelly (actor), Scottish born actor
Ryan Kelly (American football) (born 1993), American football player
Ryan Kelly (baseball) (born 1987), American baseball player
Ryan Kelly (basketball) (born 1991), American professional basketball player
Ryan Kelly (comics) (born 1976), American comic book artist
Ryan Kelly (singer) (born 1978), Irish singer with Celtic Thunder
Ryan Kelly (photojournalist) (born 1986), American photojournalist

See also
Ryan Kelley (born 1986), actor

Ryan Keely adult performer